James Thomas Rushford (born March 24, 1974) is a former professional outfielder. He played for the Milwaukee Brewers of Major League Baseball (MLB) in its 2002 season. Listed at  6' 1", 225 lb., he batted and threw left-handed.

Born in  Chicago, Illinois, Rushford attended San Diego State University, where he played for the Aztecs baseball team. He was signed by the Brewers organization as an undrafted free agent in 2000.

External links
, or Retrosheet, or Pelota Binaria (Venezuelan Winter League)

1974 births
Living people
American expatriate baseball players in Canada
American expatriate baseball players in Mexico
Baseball players from Chicago
Dubois County Dragons players
Duluth-Superior Dukes players
Guerreros de Oaxaca players
High Desert Mavericks players
Huntsville Stars players
Indianapolis Indians players
Major League Baseball outfielders
Mexican League baseball first basemen
Mexican League baseball left fielders
Milwaukee Brewers players
Mission Viejo Vigilantes players
Naranjeros de Hermosillo players
Navegantes del Magallanes players
American expatriate baseball players in Venezuela
Oklahoma RedHawks players
Ottawa Lynx players
Pastora de los Llanos players
Reading Phillies players
San Diego State Aztecs baseball players
Schaumburg Flyers players
Scranton/Wilkes-Barre Red Barons players
Tucson Toros players
Alaska Goldpanners of Fairbanks players